Benjamin Sanford Paulen  (July 14, 1869 – July 11, 1961) was an American banker and the 23rd Governor of Kansas, from 1925 to 1929.

Biography
Paulen was born in DeWitt County, Illinois, four miles south of Fredonia, to Jacob Walter and Lucy Bell (Johnson) Paulen.  The family moved to Wilson County, Kansas, in late 1869 when he was less than six months old. He graduated from Fredonia High School in 1887 and took one term at Kansas University. He took a course at Bryant and Stratton Business College in Saint Louis, Missouri, and then worked in his father's merchandise store in 1889. He married Barbara Ellis in Holton, Kansas, on February 14, 1900, and they had no children.

Career
Paulen served as city councilman, city treasurer, and then as mayor of Fredonia. He was elected in 1912 and reelected in 1916 to the Kansas State Senate. In 1922 Paulen was elected Lieutenant Governor of Kansas.

Paulen was elected and reelected to serve two terms as Governor of Kansas from 1925 to 1929. During that time, he signed the 1927 Kindergarten Bill into law, cigarette sales became legal and taxed, a state gasoline tax was sanctioned, an insurance code was established, and a banking board was organized.

Paulen served as President of the Kansas Bankers Association, and was a member of the executive council of the American Bankers Association.  He was a member of the state's constitutional revision committee in 1957.

Death and legacy
Paulen died in 1961 in Fredonia, Kansas. He is interred at Fredonia City Cemetery. 
Now part of the Fredonia High School, the Ben S. Paulen Elementary School in Fredonia was named in his honor in 1961.

References

External links
 
Get Rural Kansas
National Governors Association
 Publications concerning Kansas Governor Paulen's administration available via the KGI Online Library

 

1869 births
1961 deaths
American Bankers Association
American Christian Scientists
Republican Party governors of Kansas
Kansas city council members
Republican Party Kansas state senators
Lieutenant Governors of Kansas
Mayors of places in Kansas
People from DeWitt County, Illinois
People from Fredonia, Kansas